M1935 can refer to:

 Beretta M 1935
 Breda M1935 PG Rifle
 M1935 mine, a French anti-tank mine
 a version of the Stahlhelm combat helmet

See also 

Modèle 1935 pistol, designation for two French pistols referred to as the M1935A and M1935S